The Breakneck Road Historic District is a rural agricultural landscape near Flintstone, Allegany County, Maryland.  The farms and their associated lands have remained in the possession of a small number of families since the time of their settlement.

It was listed on the National Register of Historic Places in 1980.

References

External links
, including photo in 1978, at Maryland Historical Trust
Boundary Map of the Breakneck Road Historic District, Allegany County, at Maryland Historical Trust

Historic districts on the National Register of Historic Places in Maryland
Historic districts in Allegany County, Maryland
Historic American Buildings Survey in Maryland
National Register of Historic Places in Allegany County, Maryland